The Vlach law ("Romanian law", or , "customs of the land") refers to the traditional Romanian common law as well as to various special laws and privileges enjoyed or enforced upon particularly pastoralist communities (cf. obști) of Romanian stock or origin in European states of the Late Middle Ages and Early modern period, including in the two Romanian polities of Moldavia and Wallachia, as well as in the Kingdom of Hungary, the Kingdom of Poland, Kingdom of Serbia, the Polish–Lithuanian Commonwealth, etc. 

The term "Vlachs" originally denoted Romance-speaking populations; the term became synonymous in some contexts with "shepherds", but even in these cases an ethnical aspect was implicit. The concept originates in the laws enforced on Vlachs in the medieval Balkans. In medieval Serbian charters, the pastoral community, primarily made up of Vlachs, were held under special laws due to their nomadic lifestyle. In late medieval Croatian documents Vlachs were held by special law in which "those in villages" pay tax and "those without villages" (nomads) serve as cavalry. Until the 16th century term Vlachs was used not only to describe a representative of the Vlach law or pastoral profession, it also had an ethnic meaning which was lost in the 17th century, although was still used for people (sheepherder) regardless of their origin.

In Transylvania, after the establishment of the Union of Three Nations and the suppression of the Bobâlna Uprising in 1438, the Vlach law gradually disappeared while the Romanian masters and boyars (which enjoyed the ) had to choose between three solutions: the loss of all rights and the fall into serfdom, having to migrate beyond the Carpathians to Moldavia or Wallachia, or merging into the Hungarian nobility by converting to Catholicism and adopting the Hungarian language (the case of the Hunyadi family, for example). The last written document attesting the  dates from May 1355, when the general assembly of the Transylvanian estates was convened in Turda.

In the Habsburg monarchy, in 1630, the Vlach Statutes were enacted which defined the tenancy rights and taxation of Orthodox refugees in the Military Frontier; land were granted in return for military service. In the 16th and 17th centuries Slavic pastoral communities (such as Gorals) under the Vlach law were settled in the northern Kingdom of Hungary. The colonization of peoples under the Vlach law resulted in ethnic enclaves of Czechs, Poles and Ruthenians in historical Hungary.

See also
Universitas Valachorum
Statuta Valachorum
Ullah Millet
Vlachs (social class)

References

 
Pastoralists
Customary legal systems
Legal history of Romania
1630